The 1988 Rothmans Grand Prix was a professional ranking snooker tournament held at the Hexagon Theatre in Reading, England.

Steve Davis won in the final 10–6 against Alex Higgins.

Main draw

Final

Century breaks
 139, 103  Dean Reynolds
 138, 104  Joe O'Boye
 137  Steve Davis
 134  Robby Foldvari
 133, 132  Dave Martin
 122  Tony Knowles
 116  Terry Griffiths
 113  John Spencer
 115  Les Dodd
 114  Ian Williamson
 111  Jimmy White
 109  Bob Chaperon
 109  Bill Werbeniuk
 107  Nigel Gilbert
 102  Mark Bennett

References

1988
Grand Prix
Grand Prix (snooker)
Grand Prix (snooker)